The 1100-series IP phones are 6 different desktop IP clients manufactured by Avaya for Unified communications which can operate on the SIP or UNIStim protocols.  The SIP Firmware supports presence selection and notification along with secure instant messaging.

History 
The 1100 series of phones was originally manufactured in 2008 as an evolution of the IP Phone 2004 series of phones from Nortel.  As such it began as a UNIStim-only phone, which meant that the phone was primarily supported with only Nortel manufactured voice PBX systems.

In 2009 a firmware upgrade was made available to allow the phone to function on the SIP protocol.  This meant that the phone could now be used with a wide variety of PBX systems including those produced by Nortel, Avaya, and even open-source PBX systems such as Asterisk (PBX).

In 2010 a VPN client was added to the firmware as of release 0623C7F. This means that it is very easy to send the phone to a remote worker location with a typical cable modem or DSL Internet connection and the phone will use the VPN capability to securely establish an IP tunnel back to the corporate network and extend a standard voice telephone extension to any location on the Internet.  Other users in the global corporation can dial the user's extension and the phone will ring.

Models

1110

The 1110 supports a single telephone line and is used for lobby and conference center locations, with a fully backlit monochrome display of 143 x 32 pixels.  This phone has a two-port 10/100 Ethernet switch.

1120E
This phone is a four-line phone with gigabit Ethernet ports, and a 240 x 160 pixel display.  This device has a USB port and Bluetooth ability but in contrast its sister the 1120SA does not have these functioning USB or Bluetooth for security reasons.

1120SA

The 1120SA is a special-use phone which is certified for use by Sensitive Compartmented Information Facilities (SCIF) users, without an external device.

The National Telecommunications Security Working Group (NTSWG) has approved the Avaya IP Phone 1120SA for deployment under the Director of Central Intelligence Directive (DCID 6/9), for VoIP and VoSIP (TSG-6 Type-acceptance CNSS Class-A and Class-B Certified).

Unique security features
The major security functions are:
 Positive disconnect
 Off-hook visual indicator
 Tamper-evident labeling
 No hands-free microphone
 Signaling encryption, media encryption and user-based authentication (network access control)
 Lockable tools menu -
 VPN-capable IP phone

1140E

 VPN-capable IP phone

1150E

This phone can support up to 12 phone lines and 12 programmable soft keys, and seven additional fixed keys for agents (In-Calls, Not Ready, Make Set Busy, Supervisor, Supervisor Listen/Talk, Emergency and Activity).  This IP ACD and contact center phone with a 240 x 160 pixel display, integrates two gigabit Ethernet ports.  It also integrates Bluetooth and USB, to support wired and wireless mouse, keyboard, card readers, headsets, and flash memory drive devices.

 VPN-capable IP phone

1165E

The phone can support up to sixteen lines through the UNIStim or Session Initiation Protocol (SIP) protocols.  The display is a color QVGA resolution (320 x 240 pixels) LCD display, with the option to have multiple themes, background images, or digital pictures.  For additional security and privacy all traffic is encrypted, for both voice and signaling.  The integrated Bluetooth and USB ports support wired and wireless mouse, keyboard, card readers, headsets, and flash memory drive devices.  The phone has two gigabit Ethernet switch ports, and is powered through an IEEE 802.3af PoE device or can use a local power adapter.

Unique features
 Four soft keys
 Seven specialized feature keys: Quit, Directory, Message/Inbox, Shift/Outbox, Services, Copy, Expand.
 Supports the WML Browser

1100 expansion module

Is an expansion module that may be installed on the 1120E, 1140E, or the 1150E phones.  It extends the phones ability to support 18 telephone lines and has 18 programmable feature keys.

Additional information

Summary of supported protocols 
 Session Initiation Protocol
 UNIStim
 802.1x and EAP (MD-5)
 Signaling Encryption (AES - 128bit)
 Media Encryption
 802.1ab Link Layer Discovery Protocol (LLDP)
 802.3af PoE
 PVQM (Proactive Voice Quality Monitoring)

PBX platform compatibility 
 Avaya CS 1000
 AS5300
 BCM 400 (release 4.0 onwards)
 BCM 450
 BCM 50 (release 3.0 onwards)
 Asterisk and Trixbox
 E-Metrotel UCx20, UCx50, UCx450, UCx1000 IP Call Servers
 Pure SIP platform from SIP providers

See also
 Avaya Government Solutions
 Avaya Aura Application Server 5300 (AS5300)

Further reading

References

External links
1100 Series IP Deskphones support site
Repairing a dead Nortel/Avaya 1100 Series IP Phone
Avaya/Nortel 1100 series phone to work with Asterisk

IP Phone
VoIP hardware